The 1930 Humboldt State Lumberjacks football team represented Humboldt State College during the 1930 college football season. They competed as an independent.

The 1930 Lumberjacks were led by fourth-year head coach Fred Telonicher. They played home games at Albee Stadium in Eureka, California. Humboldt State finished winless, with a record of zero wins and six losses (0–6). The Lumberjacks were shutout in five of their six games and gave up an average of 45 points per game, being outscored 7–268 for the season.

Schedule

Notes

References

Humboldt State
Humboldt State Lumberjacks football seasons
College football winless seasons
Humboldt State Lumberjacks football